Foreign Intrigue (also known as Foreign Assignment) is a syndicated espionage drama television series produced in Europe by Sheldon Reynolds.  The 30-minute series ran for four seasons from 1951 to 1955, producing 156 episodes. It was the first filmed television series from the United States to be broadcast on Canadian television.

The program originally starred Jerome Thor for the first two seasons; in later reruns these episodes were titled Dateline Europe. Thor was succeeded by James Daly for the duration of the third season; in reruns, the Daly episodes were retitled Overseas Adventure.  The fourth and final season starred Gerald Mohr as Christopher Storm; when these episodes were rerun they were renamed Cross Current.

Premise 
Foreign Intrigue focused on activities of foreign correspondents for news services. Initially, the correspondents were Robert Cannon (Jerome Thor) and Helen Davis (Sydna Scott) for Consolidated News and Steve Godfrey (Bernard Farrel) for Amalgamated News Service. In the third season which ran from 1953 to 1954, Michael Powers (James Daly) and Patricia Bennett (Anne Preville) of Associated News were the central characters. The third season consisted of 39 thirty-minute episodes, with plots dealing with the journalists' efforts to gather information for news stories. In the fourth and final season, the focus shifted to Christopher Storm (Gerald Mohr), an American who operated a hotel in Vienna while working as an undercover agent for the United States government.

Cast

Main
 Jerome Thor as Robert Cannon (seasons 1–2)
 Sydna Scott as Helen Davis (seasons 1–2)
 James Daly as Michael Powers (season 3)
 Anne Preville as Patricia Bennett (season 3)
 Gerald Mohr as Christopher Storm (season 4)

Recurring
 John Padovano as Tony Forrest
 Gilbert Robin as Dodo (season 4)
 John Stark as Starky (season 4)

Others seen in the series were Bernard Farrel as Steve Godfrey an Amalgamated News Service reporter, Robert Arden as Steve Powers, Doreen Denning as Betty Carter, and Nikole Millinaire as a aide.

Production and locations 
Principal photography for the first two seasons was shot in Filmstaden, Stockholm. Production moved to Paris, France for the third season, and then later to Vienna, Austria for the final season, with locations throughout Europe and Scandinavia, including Copenhagen and Stockholm, utilized during the show's run.

Hal Erickson noted in his book, Syndicated Television: The First Forty Years, 1947–1987, the European production provided American viewers "something they weren't getting from their average domestic television product: breathtaking glimpses of the glamour spots of Europe."

Awards
The show was nominated for the Primetime Emmy Awards as follows:

 1953 – Nominated best mystery, action or adventure program
 1954 – Nominated best mystery, action or adventure program
 1955 – Nominated best mystery or intrigue series.

Follow-up film
Sheldon Reynolds also directed a subsequent eponymous 1956 movie, Foreign Intrigue,  based on the TV series, which starred Robert Mitchum. John Padovano reprised his role of Tony Forrest for the film.

References

External links
 
 

1951 American television series debuts
1955 American television series endings
1950s American drama television series
English-language television shows
First-run syndicated television programs in the United States
Television shows set in Vienna
American spy drama television series
American action television series
American adventure television series
Television series about journalism
Television shows adapted into films
Television shows filmed in Sweden
Television shows filmed in Paris
Television shows filmed in Austria